A springboard is a platform set upon one or usually multiple springs used in artistic gymnastics to propel a gymnast who jumps upon it further than if they had otherwise jumped off a fixed platform. The springboard is a vital part of the vault event, and is commonly used in some routines of other events, such as the balance beam, or uneven bars, to start the event by springing onto the apparatus. The number of springs in a springboard depends on the gymnast.

References

Artistic gymnastics apparatus